Jainendra K. Jain (born 1960) is an Indian-American physicist and the Evan Pugh University Professor and Erwin W. Mueller Professor of Physics at Pennsylvania State University. He is also Infosys Chair Visiting Professor at IISc, Bangalore. Jain is known for his theoretical work on quantum many body systems, most notably for postulating particles known as Composite Fermions.

Biography
Born in 1960, Jain received his primary, middle and high school education in a government school in a rural village called Sambhar, Rajasthan, located at the eastern margin of Thar desert in India. He received bachelor's degree at Maharaja College, Jaipur, his master's degree in physics at Indian Institute of Technology Kanpur and PhD at the Stony Brook University under the supervision of Prof. Philip B. Allen. After working as a post-doctoral researcher at the University of Maryland and the Yale University he returned to the Stony Brook University as a faculty in 1989. In 1998 he moved to the Pennsylvania State University as the first Erwin W. Mueller Professor of Physics. In 2012, Penn State University awarded Jain with Evan Pugh University Professorship, named after the first president of the university.

Jain is a quantum physicist in the field of condensed matter theory with interests in the area of strongly interacting electronic systems in low dimensions. As the originator of the exotic particles called composite fermions, he developed the composite fermion theory of the fractional quantum Hall effect and unified the fractional and the integral quantum Hall effects. His writings include a monograph Composite Fermions, published in 2007 by the Cambridge University Press.

Jain was a co-recipient of the Oliver E. Buckley Prize of the American Physical Society in 2002, along with Nicholas Read and Robert Willett "For theoretical and experimental work establishing the composite fermion model for the half-filled Landau level and other quantized Hall systems". He is a Fellow of the American Physical Society, American Academy of Arts and Sciences, American Association for the Advancement of Science, Alfred P. Sloan Foundation, and John Simon Guggenheim Memorial Foundation. In 2021, he was elected to the National Academy of Sciences.

References

20th-century Indian physicists
Scientists from Rajasthan
IIT Kanpur alumni
Stony Brook University alumni
Stony Brook University faculty
Pennsylvania State University faculty
American Jains
Living people
Oliver E. Buckley Condensed Matter Prize winners
American academics of Indian descent
Fellows of the American Physical Society
1960 births
Members of the United States National Academy of Sciences
Indian scholars